The  is a wind farm operated by the electric utility company J-Power alongside Lake Inawashiro in Kōriyama, Fukushima, Japan. It is approximately 1,080 meters above sea level.

The wind farm produces 65.98 megawatts of power using a total of 33 type Enercon E-70, wind turbines, and generates enough power for approximately 35,000 houses.

The facility began operating in February 2007. Each wind turbine is about 100 meters high, and each turbine blade is about 30 meters long.

See also

Aoyama Plateau Wind Farm
Seto Wind Farm

References

External links
  

Energy infrastructure completed in 2007
Wind farms in Japan
2007 establishments in Japan
Buildings and structures in Fukushima Prefecture
Kōriyama